The Highways in Tasmania generally expand from Hobart and other major cities with secondary roads interconnecting the highways to each other. Functions of these highways include freight, personal travel and tourism.
 
The AusLink Network currently consists of the Midland, Bass, Brooker, East Tamar Highway and the southern section of the Tasman Highway (Hobart-Hobart Airport).

Tasmanian highway naming is straightforward. Most are generally named after the geographical regions and features, cities, towns and settlements along the way.

Excluding the old National Highway (Brooker, Midland, Bass), Tasmanian routes have been marked with the alphanumeric marking scheme since 1979, based on the marking scheme implemented in the United Kingdom in 1922. Prior to this Tasmanian roads were marked with a National and State Route Numbering System.

As well as major highways between cities and ports, urban connectors between suburbs and commercial areas, residential streets, and forestry roads are also included. The most important state and regional connections, totalling , are state-owned roads, which are further classified into a road hierarchy.
The herirachy consists of:
 Trunk roads – major highways which are the "primary freight and passenger roads"
 Regional freight roads – regional roads which connect heavy freight to the trunk roads
 Regional access roads – providing access to Tasmania’s Regions, with less traffic than trunk and regional freight roads
 Feeder roads – connect population centres and tourist traffic to and from the rest of the state road network
 Other roads – lower traffic roads, primarily providing access to private properties

Trunk roads

The following roads are classified as trunk roads:
  Bass Highway (Launceston to Wynyard)
  Brooker Highway
  Davey Street
  Domain Highway
  East Tamar Highway
  Illawarra Road
  Macquarie Street
  Midland Highway
  Southern Outlet
  Tasman Highway (Hobart to Hobart Airport)

Regional freight roads
The following roads are classified as regional freight roads:
  Bass Highway (Wynyard to Smithton)
  Batman Highway
  Birralee Road
  Bridport Road
  Fingerpost Road
  Frankford Road (Exeter to Birralee)
  Freestone Point Road
  Huon Highway (Kingston to Huonville)
  Lyell Highway (Granton to Rosegarland)
  Old Surrey Road
  Ridgley Highway
  Tasman Highway (Hobart Airport to Triabunna, and Legerwood to Scottsdale)
  Tea Tree Road
  West Tamar Highway (Exeter to Sidmouth)

Regional access roads
The following roads are classified as regional access roads:
  Channel Highway (Kingston to Kettering)
  Huon Highway (Huonville to Dover)
  Arthur Highway
  South Arm Highway (Warrane to Howrah)
  East Derwent Highway
  Goodwood Road
  Tasman Highway (Triabunna to Swansea, and Falmouth to St Helens)
  Lyell Highway (Rosegarland to Queenstown)
  Esk Highway
  Lilydale Road
  West Tamar Highway (Launceston to Exeter)
  Zeehan Highway
  Murchison Highway (Zeehan to Guildford)
  Stony Rise Road
  Mersey Main Road
  Railton Road (Latrobe to Railton)
  Port Sorell Road (East Devonport)

See also
 List of road routes in Tasmania
 Highways in Australia for highways in other states and territories
 List of highways in Australia for roads named as highways, but not necessarily classified as highways

References

Further reading
 Commonwealth Bureau of Roads (Australia) (1978) National highways linking Hobart, Launceston and Burnie : approaches to Hobart. Canberra : Australian Government Publishing Service, Parliamentary paper PP no. 124/1977  Chairman: H.T. Loxton. 
 Newitt, Lyn, (1988) Convicts & carriageways : Tasmanian road development until 1880 edited by Alan Jones. Hobart : Dept. of Main Roads, Tasmania,

External links

 
Highways in Tasmania
Tasmania
Highways